The January 2011 Baghdad shootings occurred when four Iraqi security personnel and an engineer were killed in Baghdad on 2 January 2011 by suspected insurgents. The attackers all used silencers on their weapons, and the attacks occurred within an hour of each, which implied they were deliberately targeting government officials. There were no immediate claims of responsibility.

References

2011 murders in Iraq
21st-century mass murder in Iraq
Mass murder in 2011
Spree shootings in Iraq
Terrorist incidents in Iraq in 2011
2010s in Baghdad
Terrorist incidents in Baghdad
January 2011 events in Iraq